Loukhi-3 is an air base in the Republic of Karelia, Russia located  west of Loukhi.  It is a minor airstrip with only turnarounds and a 400-meter central taxiway.

Loukhi had some use during World War II and probably maintained forward fighter deployments in the 1950s and 1960s.

References
RussianAirFields.com

Soviet Air Force bases
Airports in the Republic of Karelia
Loukhsky District